MACS1149-JD1 (also known as PCB2012 3020) is one of the farthest known galaxies from Earth and is at a redshift of about z=9.11, or about .

See also
 CEERS-93316
 GLASS-z12
 HD1 galaxy
 List of the most distant astronomical objects

References

External links
 
 NASA Telescopes Spy Ultra-Distant Galaxy

Leo (constellation)
Dwarf galaxies